Richard Paul Scesniak (June 28, 1940 – April 1, 1986) was an American football coach. He served as the head football coach at Kent State University from 1983 to 1985, compiling a record of 8–25. Scesniak died of an apparent heart attack on April 1, 1986 after he collapsed while exercising at Dix Stadium in Kent, Ohio.

Head coaching record

References

External links
 

1940 births
1986 deaths
American football linebackers
Iowa State Cyclones football coaches
Iowa State Cyclones football players
Kent State Golden Flashes football coaches
Missouri Tigers football coaches
New York Giants coaches
Utah Utes football coaches
Washington Huskies football coaches
Wisconsin Badgers football coaches
Players of American football from Chicago